1117 Reginita is a stony background asteroid from the inner regions of the asteroid belt. It was discovered on 24 May 1927, by Catalan astronomer Josep Comas i Solà at the Fabra Observatory in Barcelona, Spain, who named it after his niece.

Orbit and classification 

Reginita is a non-family asteroid of the main belt's background population when applying the hierarchical clustering method to its proper orbital elements. It orbits the Sun in the inner asteroid belt at a distance of 1.8–2.7 AU once every 3 years and 4 months (1,231 days; semi-major axis of 2.25 AU). Its orbit has an eccentricity of 0.20 and an inclination of 4° with respect to the ecliptic. The body's observation arc also begins at Heidelberg in April 1930, almost three years after its official discovery observation at Barcelona.

Naming 

This minor planet was named after the niece of the discoverer. The  was mentioned in The Names of the Minor Planets by Paul Herget in 1955.

Physical characteristics 

In the Tholen classification, Reginita is a common, stony S-type asteroid.

Rotation period 

Several rotational lightcurves of Reginita have been obtained from photometric observations since 1988. The consolidated lightcurve analysis gave a rotation period of 2.946 hours with a brightness amplitude between 0.10 and 0.33 magnitude.

Diameter and albedo 

According to the survey carried out by the NEOWISE mission of NASA's Wide-field Infrared Survey Explorer (WISE), Reginita measures between 9.82 and 11.22 kilometers in diameter and its surface has an albedo between 0.293 and 0.36. The Collaborative Asteroid Lightcurve Link adopts Petr Pravec's revised WISE data, that is, an albedo of 0.3516 and a diameter of 10.29 kilometers based on an absolute magnitude of 11.69.

References

External links 
 Lightcurve Database Query (LCDB), at www.minorplanet.info
 Dictionary of Minor Planet Names, Google books
 Asteroids and comets rotation curves, CdR – Geneva Observatory, Raoul Behrend
 Discovery Circumstances: Numbered Minor Planets (1)-(5000) – Minor Planet Center
 
 

001117
Discoveries by Josep Comas Solà
Named minor planets
19270524